Aernout is a masculine Dutch given name. Notable people with the name include:

Aernout Philip Theodoor Eyssell (1837–1921), Dutch lawyer, judge, and politician
Aernout Mik (born 1962), Dutch artist
Aernout van Buchel (1565–1641), Dutch antiquarian and humanist
Aernout van Lennep (1898–1974), Dutch equestrian
Aernout van Lynden (born 1954), Dutch-British journalist
Aernout van Overbeke (1632–1674), Dutch writer and humourist

Dutch masculine given names